Player Manager is a football management game, released for the Amiga and Atari ST in 1990. It was notable for being the first game to combine both managing the team and playing as a single player. The match engine borrowed heavily from the Kick Off match engine, which was developed by Dino Dini and Anco Software, who also created Player Manager. This was the first in a series of games called Player Manager.

Gameplay

Players would take control of a third division side as player-manager, acting in both managing and playing aspects. The latter option was optional, since players could choose whether to control the player only or the entire team from the outset. They can opt to do neither, if they choose not to play the matches personally.

The Player Manager universe is structured somewhat differently from real-life football of the same period. Many notable clubs are not featured in the game, as the programmers chose to have 10 teams in the top two divisions, and 12 in the third and fourth divisions, presumably due to memory constraints. There is also only one domestic cup competition. And, as with the majority of the football games of the time, the game is notable now for featuring no European football, due to English clubs exclusion from European competition owing to the Heysel Stadium disaster. 

Further reference to recent problems in real-life football come courtesy of news items that make reference to the Bradford City stadium fire, and the general problems experienced in relation to football hooliganism at the time, particularly the aforementioned Heysel. This is the first of several eccentricities in the game; if the team operated by the player attempts to hoard money, they will experience consistent fires and fines due to hooliganism, as a mechanism to keep their bank balance down.

Magazine reviews

ST Action         - A stroke of pure genius.
The One           - An exceptional football management sim. Astounding depth, most involved, rewarding and playable.
ACE               - Successfully blends challenging soccer management with frantic end to end arcade action. 920
New Comp Express  - The sheer depth is incredible. A definitive management game.
Commodore User    - At last a management game that requires true management skills - a winner 94%
ST Format         - Brilliant. 93%
Amiga Format      - Enthralling and addictive. 93%
Zzap!64              - Best football management game ever written. 92%

Remake
A remake of the game was in development for iPhone. but was shelved and never released. A remake with the original graphics by Steve Screech was developed and released on Google Play Store and elected as one of the best 3 football managerial games on Android.

References

External links

1990 video games
Amiga games
Anco Software games
Association football management video games
Association football video games
Atari ST games
Single-player video games
Video games developed in the United Kingdom